U.S. Route 6 (US 6) in Massachusetts is a  portion of the cross-country route connecting Providence, Rhode Island, to Fall River, New Bedford, and Cape Cod. In the Fall River and New Bedford areas, US 6 parallels Interstate 195 (I-195). On Cape Cod, US 6 is a highway interconnecting the towns of the area. The expressway section in this area is also known as the Mid-Cape Highway. The highway is also alternatively signed as the "Grand Army of the Republic Highway".

The section of the Mid Cape Highway between exit 78 and the Orleans rotary is known to locals as "Suicide Alley" due to the number of fatal accidents that happen on this stretch of super-two highway with only a berm separating the lanes of traffic.

Route description

Seekonk to the Sagamore Bridge
US 6 is a four-lane road for approximately its first  from the Rhode Island line (crossing into Massachusetts from East Providence, Rhode Island, to Seekonk) to the Cape Cod Canal, except for sections in New Bedford, where it runs along a one-way pair, and Fall River, where it is a two-lane avenue.

US 6 enters Massachusetts into Seekonk, just south of I-195. The first mile and a quarter passes through the busy Seekonk retail area. The route passes through Rehoboth and Swansea, with access to I-195 at Route 136, which heads southward into Bristol County, Rhode Island. The road then has an interchange with I-195 at the latter's exit 3, just east of the southern terminus of Route 118. The road heads through the southern end of Somerset before crossing the Veterans Memorial Bridge over the Taunton River into the city of Fall River. On the Somerset end of the bridge, Route 103 meets its eastern terminus and Route 138 joins US 6 to cross the bridge as concurrent routes. Prior to late 2011, Route 6 and Route 138 followed a previous alignment over the Brightman Street Bridge, which has since closed.

Once Route 6/Route 138 enter Fall River, Route 138 splits off and US 6 follows two halves as Davol Street on either side of Route 79 before turning east as two-lane President Avenue, following up the Seven Hills to the Highlands neighborhood. At the end of President Avenue the road turns southward at a rotary (which also provides access to Route 24) onto four-lane Eastern Avenue. The road has another interchange with I-195 one last time before turning eastward along Martine Street onto the "Narrows", the thin strip of land between the Watuppa Ponds that also carries the interstate between Fall River and Westport. Once over the Narrows, the road turns southeast, traveling through the town. I-195 can be accessed from Route 6 in Westport via Route 88, which intersects with Route 6 shortly before meeting its northern terminus at the Interstate. At the Dartmouth line, the road serves as the eastern terminus of Route 177. After passing through the Dartmouth retail area and two roads (Reed Road and Faunce Corner Road) that provide access to I-195, the route passes into the city of New Bedford.

In New Bedford, the route splits just east of the southern terminus of Route 140 onto Kempton Street (eastbound) and Mill Street (westbound), two one-lane, one-way streets. The two halves join again to serve as the southern terminus of Route 18 just before crossing the New Bedford – Fairhaven Bridge into the town of Fairhaven. After serving as the southern terminus of Route 240 the route continues east into Mattapoisett and Marion along a four-lane road. Access to I-195 is provided in both towns along North Street in Mattapoisett and Route 105 in Marion. US 6 then crosses the Weweantic River into Wareham. In the central part of town, the route turns southeast along Main Street, then east-northeast along Sandwich Road before beginning a concurrency with Route 28, with the first  being split one-way between east and west, just south of Route 25, the major connecting highway between Cape Cod and I-195 and I-495. The route passes through busy retail area of East Wareham before passing into Buzzards Bay. The two routes split into east and west one-way sections again before Route 28 leaves the concurrency to cross the Bourne Bridge across the Cape Cod Canal. US 6 then follows the western side of the canal along the Scenic Highway into Sagamore before joining the right-of-way for Route 3 that ends at the Sagamore Bridge, in which US 6 crosses onto Cape Cod proper.

Cape Cod

US 6 is the primary highway serving the towns of Cape Cod, linking the communities to the Sagamore Bridge and to subsequent points north and west. Of the 15 towns on the cape, US 6 enters all but three of them; it runs completely to the north of Falmouth, Mashpee, and Chatham.

After crossing the canal via the Sagamore Bridge, US 6 becomes a freeway, known as the Mid-Cape Highway. From the Sagamore Bridge to exits 78A and 78B, the freeway comprises four lanes. The bridges from the Cape Cod Canal to Oak Street in Barnstable (a half-mile [] west of exit 68), are unusual in their construction since they are made out of concrete and granite. The road then reduces to a two-lane freeway with plastic stanchions posted on a small asphalt median. The two-lane freeway section has a secondary, less-formal name of "Suicide Alley", due to the high number of fatalities from head-on collisions before the median improvements were constructed from 1989–1992. It remains like this until Orleans, where the freeway ends at a large rotary.

Through Eastham and North Truro, US 6 is a four-lane surface street once again. Through Wellfleet and southern Truro, US 6 is a former three-lane road converted to two lanes with broad shoulders. In Provincetown, the road is locally maintained, and ends as a surface expressway before meeting Route 6A at the Cape Cod National Seashore. For the last several miles in Provincetown, eastbound US 6 is actually heading west-southwest.

History

New England Route 3

Before the U.S. Numbered Highway System, the route from Rhode Island to Bourne, and from Orleans to Provincetown, was part of New England Route 3 (Route 3). Within the Upper Cape, however, Route 3 went along what is now Route 28 between Bourne and Orleans. The US 6 designation was instead applied to the route on the north shore of Cape Cod, which was known as Route 6 before 1926 (now Route 6A).

Prior to the building of I-195, the Fall River portion of US 6 followed a different alignment. After entering the city via the Brightman Street Bridge, the route followed Davol Street to Turner Street, where it split to Durfee Street, a short portion of South Main Street and Pleasant Street (eastbound) and North Main Street to Bedford Street to Eastern Avenue (westbound, in reverse order). Both routes then took Pleasant Street east of Eastern Avenue to McGowan Street, which crossed into Westport and joined the current alignment of US 6. The current alignment of these streets would be impossible now, as Turner Street's connection to Durfee Street is blocked, and both Pleasant Street and McGowan Street end just before the ramps between I-195 and Route 24. Their former pathway into Westport is also gone, replaced by the path of the Interstate. The only remnants of the old path is the odd turn Old Bedford Road takes before intersecting, having once been a separate street; the original alignment would have extended straight to US 6.

US 6 bypass
When US 6 was first routed through Provincetown in 1926, the highway was signed along the rather narrow Commercial Street. After the Provincetown US 6 bypass was built, congestion and the increasing size of automobiles forced the town to post most of Commercial Street (all but the easternmost mile that hits the Truro line) as one-way westbound. Route 6A, when signed, was placed along the paralleling Bradford Street instead. There was an alternate plan at the time to make Bradford one-way westbound and Commercial one-way eastbound (which would have made both roads Route 6A), but this was rejected, as the town decided instead to let incoming traffic through the heavy Commercial Street (almost entirely pedestrian) business district.

US 6 was briefly signed on current I-195 between Route 105 and Route 28; however, when I-195 was completed, and the I-195 designation took over that section of freeway, US 6 reverted to its older route.

Formerly, US 6 took both sides along the Cape Cod Canal (and was signed as US 6 Bypass, or US 6 Byp.), but is now routed only on the north side (The south side is now signed "TO 6" from the Sagamore Bridge to the Bourne Bridge). However, a single US 6 Byp. sign still exists along Sandwich Road just north of the Bourne Bridge rotary.

Milepost-based exit numbering
The Massachusetts Department of Transportation (MassDOT) planned to change the exit numbers along the Mid-Cape Highway in 2016, as part of sign replacement contract to be run concurrently with a statewide project to convert freeway exit numbers from a sequential to a distance-based system. The new exit numbers would have ranged from 55 in Sandwich to 88 in Orleans. The first interchange on the Mid-Cape with Route 3 that is now signed as exits 1A to 1B would have been resigned as exits 55A to 55B, and so forth. However, in February 2016, when local Cape Cod officials found out about the plan, including the new numbers and that the signs would be larger than the current ones to be placed on overhead gantries, they complained to MassDOT and their local legislators. In response, MassDOT announced at a June 2016 public meeting that it listened to the public comments and were redesigning the signs to match the size of the current ones and that the exit numbers would not be changed, for now. The exit tabs and gore signs for the new signage would be designed however so the milepost numbers could fit on them, if changed, sometime in the future. The winning bid for the scaled down contract simply to replace the signs was made by Liddell Bros. Inc. of Halifax and announced on February 7, 2017. The project started in mid-2017 and was completed in late 2019. Meanwhile, on November 18, 2019, MassDOT announced that a statewide exit renumbering project would begin in the last part of 2020. While Cape officials again objected to the proposed numbers (based on the same mileage as those in 2016 from the Rhode Island border), state officials this time held their ground. The statewide project started on October 18, 2020, with Route 140. Work to renumber US 6 started on December 13, 2020, and was completed on December 24, 2020.

Major intersections

Related routes
  Route 6A, a more northern alignment of US 6 in Cape Cod prior to the construction of the Mid-Cape Highway
  Route 28, the original alignment of Route 3 in Cape Cod
  Route 3, the designation of US 6 (excluding the stretch from Bourne to Orleans) prior to 1926
  Route 6, the designation of US 6 between Bourne and Orleans, as well as of US 3/Route 3 prior to 1926

See also
 New England road marking system
 List of U.S. Highways in Massachusetts

References

External links

 Highway photos from Mile by mile

 Massachusetts
06
Two-lane freeways in the United States
Transportation in Bristol County, Massachusetts
Transportation in Plymouth County, Massachusetts
Transportation in Barnstable County, Massachusetts
1926 establishments in Massachusetts